Branciforte may refer to:

 The , an Italian and, later, Spanish noble family
 Miguel de la Grúa Talamanca, 1st Marquis of Branciforte (1755-1812),  was a Spanish military officer and 53rd Viceroy of New Spain, after whom the pueblo of Branciforte was named
 Branciforte, was the last of only three secular pueblos founded by the Spanish colonial government of Alta California, and is now part of the city of Santa Cruz, California
 Branciforte County, California, the original name of Santa Cruz County, California
 Bruno Branciforte (born 1947), an Italian admiral